The  is a DC commuter electric multiple unit (EMU) train type operated in the Tokyo area of Japan by the Tokyo Waterfront Area Rapid Transit. The train was built by Kawasaki Heavy Industries and first entered revenue service in 1996. Its design is based on the 209 series.

Formations
, eight 10-car sets, numbered Z1 to Z3 and Z6 to Z10, are based at Yashio Depot in Tokyo (accessed via a spur located between Tennōzu Isle Station and Tokyo Teleport Station). These sets are formed as follows with six motored ("M") cars and four non-powered trailer ("T") cars.

 Cars 3, 6, and 9 are each fitted with one lozenge-type pantograph.
 Cars 1 and 10 have wheelchair space.
 Car 4 is designated as a mildly air-conditioned car.

History

Four 4-car trains were originally built and entered service in 1996 when the Rinkai Line opened between Shin-Kiba and Tokyo Teleport. A fifth train was built in 1999 for service expansion, and a sixth was built in 2001 for the extension of the line to Tennōzu Isle. In 2002, for the opening of the entire line to Ōsaki, the first five trains were extended to 6 cars, the sixth train was extended to 10 cars, and four new 10-car trains were built, for a total of five 6-car and five 10-car trains. The 10-car trains were also used on through services to/from the JR Saikyō Line.

From October 2004, the five 6-car trains were reformed as three 10-car trains. Six new trailer cars were built for the conversion, while six surplus cab and motor cars were sold to JR East to create 209-3100 series EMUs used on the Hachikō Line and Kawagoe Line.

209-3100 series conversions

Six former 70-000 series cars were converted in 2004 and 2005 to become 209-3100 series EMUs for use by JR East. The subsequent identities of these cars are as shown below. (The former car numbers were reused when other spare cars were renumbered.)

Future
The fleet of 70-000 series is expected to be replaced by a new train type in 2024.

References

External links

 Information on TWR website 

Electric multiple units of Japan
Tokyo Waterfront Area Rapid Transit
Train-related introductions in 1996
Kawasaki multiple units
1500 V DC multiple units of Japan